Claude Hall (September 4, 1932 – July 7, 2017) was an American journalist and a writer for and longtime radio-TV editor of Billboard.

In 1965, Hall coined the term "easy listening" to describe the sound of WPIX-FM, a radio station then heard in metropolitan New York City.

Hall is the author of the e-book "Radio Wars", which was published in 2012. He was born in Brady, Texas and died in Las Vegas, Nevada.

References

2017 deaths
American male journalists
American magazine editors
1932 births
People from Brady, Texas
20th-century American journalists